São Paulo Futebol Clube, also known as São Paulo-AP, or simply São Paulo, is a Brazilian football club based in Macapá, Amapá. The team competes in the Campeonato Amapaense, the top division in the Amapá state football league system.

History
The club was founded on 3 February 1988, adopting similar colors, team kits and logo as São Paulo Futebol Clube of São Paulo state.

Stadium

Like other clubs in the state, São Paulo does not have its own stadium. Since 2017, all football matches in Amapá are held at Zerão. Up until 2014, the team also played at Glicerão, which is currently undergoing renovation.

Honours

State 

 Campeonato Amapaense
 Runners-up: 2014

 Campeonato Amapaense Segunda Divisão
 Runners-up: 2007
Campeonato Amapaense U20
 Runners-up: 2022

References

Football clubs in Amapá
Association football clubs established in 1988
1988 establishments in Brazil